Linsalata Capital Partners (also known as LinCap) is a private equity firm focused on leveraged buyout investments in middle-market companies across a broad range of industries.  The firm has focused its investments in the healthcare services, building products and packaging industries.

Linsalata Capital was formed in 1984, by Frank N. Linsalata and is based in Mayfield Heights, Ohio. The firm has raised over $1 billion of investor commitments including $425 million for its 2005 fund, Linsalata Capital Partners V.

Prior to founding the firm in 1984, Frank Linsalata worked in various capacities within Midland-Ross Corp., over eighteen years. He served as Chief Financial Officer and later as became Executive Vice President with oversight of the company's $450 million capital equipment business.

References

 Midland-Ross sells its Somerset Engineering division to Somerset Technologies
 Transtar Industries sold by Linsalata Capital to Friedman Fleischer & Lowe  Crains Cleveland Business, December 7, 2010
 Linsalata lures $45M for new fund Crain's Cleveland Business, April 17, 1995
 LinCap Raises $333.5 mln for Newest Fund.  Corporate Financing Week, November 6, 2000

 Linsalata isn't finished gobbling up acquisitions.  Crains Cleveland Business, January 24, 2000
 Linsalata Capital Partners Acquires Eatem Corporation; GE Antares Supports the Deal.  February 19, 2010

External links
Linsalata Capital Partners (company website)

Financial services companies of the United States